Sir Alan Charles Laurence Whistler   (21 January 1912 – 19 December 2000) was a British glass engraver and poet. He was both the first President of the British Guild of Glass Engravers and the first recipient of the King's Gold Medal for Poetry.

Early life
Whistler was a son of builder and estate agent Henry Whistler and Helen Frances Mary, daughter of Rev. Charles Slegg Ward, vicar of Wootton St Lawrence in Hampshire, whose wife, Jessy, was granddaughter of the goldsmith and silversmith Paul Storr. He was educated at Stowe School.

Career
In 1935, Whistler became the first recipient of the King's Gold Medal for Poetry. Verse works of his included 'The Emperor Heart' ; 'Four Walls'; 'Armed October and other Poems'; and 'In Time of Suspense', in 1940, published by William Heinemann. He also wrote a biography, 'Sir John Vanbrugh, Architect and Dramatist'. However, he began engraving to supplement his income, and later largely turned away from verse.

He engraved on goblets and bowls blown to his own designs, and (increasingly, as he became more celebrated) on large-scale panels and windows for churches and private houses. He also engraved on three-sided prisms, some of them designed to revolve on a small turntable so that the prism's internal reflections completed the image. The best-known of these was done as a memorial to his elder brother, Rex Whistler.

His early works include a casket for the Queen Mother, and a hinged glass triptych to hold her daily schedule. Other engravings of his can be found, for example, in Salisbury, where his family lived during part of his childhood, including a pair of memorial panels with quotations by T. S. Eliot, and the Rex Prism in the Morning Chapel, both in Salisbury Cathedral; at the Ashmolean Museum; at Balliol College, Oxford where he was an undergraduate, and St Hugh's College, Oxford, where he also designed the Swan Gates leading from the college grounds onto Canterbury Road; at Stowe House in Stowe, Buckinghamshire; at the village church of St Nicholas at Moreton, Dorset, where every window was engraved by him over about 30 years; and in the Corning Museum of Glass (USA).

In 1947, Whistler created one of the wedding gifts for Princess Elizabeth, a glass goblet engraved with the words of a 1613 poem by Thomas Campion, written for the marriage of Elizabeth of Bohemia, daughter of James I.

Honours
Whistler's many honours included an OBE in the 1955 New Years Honours List and a CBE in the 1973 Queen's Birthday Honours List. In the 2000 Queen's Birthday Honours List, not long before his death at the age of 88, he was created a Knight Bachelor.

In 1975, he became the first President of the newly founded British Guild of Glass Engravers.

Personal life
In 1939, Whistler married the actress Jill Furse. Their son, Simon (1940–2005) was a musician and also a notable glass engraver. Jill died in 1944, of blood poisoning, soon after giving birth to a daughter Caroline; Laurence's brother, Rex Whistler, died the same year. In 1950, he married Jill's younger sister, Theresa (1927–2007), and they had two children Daniel and Frances; the marriage was later dissolved. In 1987, he married a third time to Carol Dawson, but was divorced in 1991.  For much of his life he lived at Little Place, Silver Street, Lyme Regis, Dorset.

References
Oxford Dictionary of National Biography, Whistler, Sir (Alan Charles) Laurence (1912–2000), glass engraver, writer, and architectural historian, by Robin Ravilious
The Initials in the Heart. Michael Russell Publishing Ltd. (June 2000)  
Point Engraving on Glass (The Decorative Arts Library). Walker Books Ltd. (September 1997),  
The Laughter and the Urn: The Life of Rex Whistler. Weidenfeld & Nicolson Ltd (January 1986)  
The Image on the Glass. Cupid Press (1975),  
Stowe: Guide to the Gardens. E. N. Hillier & Sons, 3rd (further revised) edition (January 1, 1974)

1912 births
2000 deaths
English engravers
Glass engravers
Commanders of the Order of the British Empire
Knights Bachelor
Place of birth missing
Place of death missing
20th-century English poets
English male poets
20th-century English male writers
English biographers
Male biographers
British glass artists
20th-century engravers
People educated at Stowe School